Shaheed Bir Bikrom Ramiz Uddin Cantonment College is a school and university college in Dhaka, Bangladesh, adjacent to Sursoptok underpass. It is managed by the Bangladesh Army and primarily for the children of Army personnel. Pupils from the civilian section also can study in this college.

History
On 29 July 2018 two students from the college died in a road accident on Airport Road, Dhaka. The incident impelled students to demand safer roads and stricter traffic laws, and the demonstrations rapidly spread throughout Bangladesh.

Gallery

See also 
 2018 Bangladesh road-safety protests

References 

Schools in Dhaka District
Colleges in Dhaka District
1939 establishments in British India
Educational institutions established in 1939
Educational Institutions affiliated with Bangladesh Army